The Belton Subdivision is a railroad line owned by CSX Transportation in the U.S. State of South Carolina. At its east end the line continues west from the Spartanburg Subdivision and at its west end the line continues west as the Greenville and Western Railway.

See also
 List of CSX Transportation lines

References

CSX Transportation lines